John Samuel "Red" Juelich  (September 20, 1916 – December 25, 1970) was a second baseman in Major League Baseball. He played for the Pittsburgh Pirates.

References

External links

1916 births
1970 deaths
Major League Baseball second basemen
Pittsburgh Pirates players
Baseball players from St. Louis